Ursina Greuter is a paralympic athlete from Switzerland competing mainly in category T52 wheelchair racing events.

Ursina has competed in two Paralympics winning six medals. In her first games in 1996 she won the 400m and won bronze medals in the 200m and 800m.  In the 2000 Summer Paralympics she just failed to defend her 400m title finishing second to Canadian Lisa Franks but she did win the 100m and also won a second bronze medal in the 800m.

References

Paralympic athletes of Switzerland
Athletes (track and field) at the 1996 Summer Paralympics
Athletes (track and field) at the 2000 Summer Paralympics
Paralympic gold medalists for Switzerland
Paralympic silver medalists for Switzerland
Paralympic bronze medalists for Switzerland
Living people
Medalists at the 1996 Summer Paralympics
Medalists at the 2000 Summer Paralympics
Year of birth missing (living people)
Paralympic medalists in athletics (track and field)
Swiss female wheelchair racers